Sergei Leonidovich Pyatikopov (born 23 June 1978) is a Russian professional football coach and a former player. He is an assistant coach with FC Zenit-Izhevsk.

Club career
He made his Russian Football National League debut for FC Gazovik-Gazprom Izhevsk on 2 July 1998 in a game against FC Druzhba Maykop.

Honours
 Russian Second Division, Zone East best defender: 2009, 2010.

References

External links
 

1978 births
Sportspeople from Izhevsk
Living people
Russian footballers
Association football defenders
FC Ural Yekaterinburg players
FC Lada-Tolyatti players
FC Yenisey Krasnoyarsk players
FC Novokuznetsk players
FC Izhevsk players
FC Zenit-Izhevsk players